The 1964 Fiji rugby union tour of Europe and Canada, was a series of matches played by the Fiji national rugby union team in Wales, France, and Canada between September and October 1964. Twelve matches were played, three against national sides.

Results 
Scores and results list Fiji's points tally first.

References 
 Fijian Rugby Union Site

Notes 

Fij
Fiji national rugby union team tours
Rugby union tours of Wales
Rugby union tours of France
Rugby union tours of Canada
tour
tour
tour
tour